Lemonade is an EP by Wheatus, released in 2004, exclusively available at Apple's iTunes Music Store. It features live versions of songs that originally appeared on Wheatus's poorly promoted second album Hand Over Your Loved Ones.

Track listing
 "Lemonade" (Live) – 3:22
 "Anyway" (Live) – 4:09
 "The Deck" (Live) – 2:38
 "Freak On" (Live) – 4:44
 "Randall" (Live) – 4:18

Wheatus albums
2004 EPs